Balochistan United Women Football Club is a Pakistani women's football club based in Quetta. The club competes in the National Women Football Championship.

History
In 2004 Rubina Irfan founded Balochistan United around her three daughters and entered the team into the Pakistani women's football championship. The Club accepts players from all religious and ethnic backgrounds: "For women to progress in Pakistan, we do not need to draw even more lines between them," said Irfan.

Players

Retired numbers

7  Shahlyla Baloch, Forward (2005–2016)

Honours
National Women Football Championship: 2014

References

External links
 Official website

Women's football clubs in Pakistan
Association football clubs established in 2004
2004 establishments in Pakistan
Football in Quetta